Andreea Trufaşu (born 16 March 1978) is a Romanian swimmer. She competed in the women's 4 × 100 metre freestyle relay event at the 1996 Summer Olympics.

References

External links
 

1978 births
Living people
Olympic swimmers of Romania
Swimmers at the 1996 Summer Olympics
Place of birth missing (living people)
Romanian female freestyle swimmers